The 1977 Western Carolina Catamounts team represented Western Carolina University as a member of the Southern Conference (SoCon) during the 1977 NCAA Division I football season. The Catamounts were led by ninth-year head coach Bob Waters and played their home games at E. J. Whitmire Stadium in Cullowhee, North Carolina. The finished the season with an overall record of 6–4–1 and a mark of 2–2–1 in conference play, placing fifth in the SoCon.

Schedule

References

Western Carolina
Western Carolina Catamounts football seasons
Western Carolina Catamounts football